Funda Bilgi (born June 4, 1983) is a Turkish volleyball player. She is 163 cm and plays as libero. She plays for Galatasaray Medical Park.

Awards

Club
 2011-12 Turkish Cup -  Runner-up, with Galatasaray Daikin
 2011-12 CEV Cup -  Runner-up, with Galatasaray Daikin

See also
 Turkish women in sports

References

1983 births
Living people
Turkish women's volleyball players
Galatasaray S.K. (women's volleyball) players
20th-century Turkish sportswomen
21st-century Turkish sportswomen